James Allen McDonald (June 9, 1915 – May 1, 1997) was a college and professional American football player, and later the football head coach at the University of Tennessee for one season.

College playing career
McDonald was a halfback and quarterback for the Ohio State University football team from 1935 to 1937.  In his senior year he was a team co-captain, and was named as an All-America selection.  McDonald's most memorable play that year was only worth one point.  He was kicking a point after touchdown against Northwestern and the ball was blocked.  The holder, Mike Kabealo, grabbed the ball, pitched it back to McDonald.  McDonald ran the ball around the right side for the point.  The final score was 7–0.

McDonald was also a three-year starter as a guard on the Ohio State basketball team from 1936 to 1938.  As a senior, he served as team captain.

McDonald was inducted into the Ohio State Varsity O Hall of Fame in 1986.

Professional playing career
McDonald was selected by the Philadelphia Eagles as the second pick in the 1938 NFL Draft, but never played for that team.  He played two seasons with the Detroit Lions, picking up a career total of 80 yards.

Coaching career
McDonald was an assistant football coach at the University of Tennessee under head coach Bowden Wyatt from 1955 to 1962.  He succeeded Wyatt as head coach in 1963, but stayed at that position for only one year.  McDonald remained at Tennessee as an assistant athletic director.

Family
McDonald's son, James McDonald, Jr., was a starting defensive end for the Volunteers in 1967.

Head coaching record

References

External links
 

1915 births
1997 deaths
American football fullbacks
American football halfbacks
American men's basketball players
Del Monte Pre-Flight Navyators football players
Detroit Lions players
Ohio State Buckeyes football players
Ohio State Buckeyes men's basketball players
Tennessee Volunteers football coaches
Saint Mary's Pre-Flight Air Devils football players
Sportspeople from Springfield, Ohio
Coaches of American football from Ohio
Players of American football from Ohio
Basketball players from Ohio